Dynamix was an American video game developer from 1984 to 2001.

Dynamix may also refer to:
 Dynamix (band), an electronica and dance music duo
 Mark Dynamix, an Australian DJ
 Dynamix (video game), a 2014 Hong Kong music game developed by C4Cat

See also
 Dynamics